Sir Aubrey Fiennes Trotman-Dickenson (12 February 1926 – 11 November 2016) was a British chemist and academic administrator.

Biography
Trotman-Dickenson was born in Wilmslow, Cheshire on 12 February 1926. His father, Edward Newton Trotman-Dickenson was a cotton merchant and his mother was Violet Murray, née Nicoll. He attended Winchester College and continued to study Chemistry with a scholarship to Balliol College, Oxford in 1948.

He was Principal of the University of Wales Institute of Science and Technology (UWIST) from 1968 to 1988, and Principal of its successor, University of Wales College of Cardiff, from 1988 to 1993. He additionally served as the Vice-Chancellor of the University of Wales for three terms: 1975 to 1977, 1983 to 1985, and 1991 to 1993. He was previously a lecturer in chemistry at the University of Edinburgh, and Professor of Chemistry at University College of Wales, Aberystwyth.

On 11 July 1953 he married economist, Donata Irena (Danusia) Hewell and they had three children together. He died on 11 November 2016, at his home in Siston Court as a result of heart failure.

Honours
In the 1989 Queen's Birthday Honours, it was announced that Trotman-Dickenson had been appointed a Knight Bachelor, and therefore granted the title sir, in recognition of his service as Principal of University of Wales, College of Cardiff. On 5 December 1989, he was knighted by Queen Elizabeth II during a ceremony at Buckingham Palace.

In 1963, Trotman-Dickenson was the Tilden Lecturer for the Chemical Society. In 1995, he was awarded an honorary Doctor of Laws (LLD) degree by the University of Wales.

Selected works

References

1926 births
2016 deaths
British chemists
Vice-Chancellors of the University of Wales
Academics of the University of Edinburgh
Academics of Aberystwyth University
Academics of Cardiff University
Knights Bachelor